Dylan Different is a smooth jazz album by keyboardist and jazz vocalist Ben Sidran, released in 2009. It is Sidran's thirty-sixth album, and his fourth release with his independent label Nardis Records.

Background

A tribute to Bob Dylan, the album consists of covers of his songs, reinterpreted as jazz. Sidran maintained the original lyrics, but introduced revised tempos, instruments and a large backing band.

The album was recorded 1–4 June 2009. Eschewing a traditional recording studio, Sidran elected to record the album in an Alsatian farm house in the east of France, explaining that he wanted to introduce the same haunted, mysterious quality that he felt from Dylan's music. Several of the musicians were also European, including Rodolphe Burger, a French singer and musician; Marcello Giuliani, an Italian bassist; and Alberto Malo, a Spanish drummer.

Track listing

Personnel

Musicians
 Ben Sidranvocals, piano, Wulitizer, Hammond B3, Fender Rhodes
 Rodolphe Burgerguitar, vocal on "Blowin' in the Wind"
 Jorge Drexlervocals on "Knockin' on Heaven's Door"
 Georgie Famevocals and organ on "Rainy Day Woman #12 & 35"
 Marcello Giulianiacoustic bass, electric bass
 Amy Helmbackground vocals
 Michael Leonharttrumpet, flugelhorn
 Bob Malachtenor saxophone, flute, bass clarinet
 Alberto Malodrums, percussion
 Leo Sidranhorn arrangements, additional guitar, Hammond B3, piano, koto
 Leonor Watling & Lucabackground vocals on "Knockin' on Heaven's Door"

Reception

Writing for AllMusic, Thom Jurek praised Sidran's interpretation and style, "his requisite musicality, unaffected jazzman's cool, and streetwise yet elegant poetic imagination." He also praised the source material, commenting on Dylan's ability to write "folk songs that transcend their eras of origin in relevancy."

See also
List of songs written by Bob Dylan
List of artists who have covered Bob Dylan songs

References

Ben Sidran albums
2009 albums
Bob Dylan tribute albums
Covers albums